Deh-e Mian (also Romanized as Deh-e Mīān, Deh Meyān, Deh Mīyān; also known as Deh Mū’ī) is a village in Takab Rural District, Kuhsorkh County, Razavi Khorasan Province, Iran. At the 2006 census, its population was 843, in 225 families.

References 

Populated places in Kuhsorkh County